Edvard Huupponen (1 December 1898 – 4 January 1977) was a Finnish wrestler. He competed in the freestyle featherweight event at the 1924 Summer Olympics.

References

External links
 

1898 births
1977 deaths
People from Ruokolahti
People from Viipuri Province (Grand Duchy of Finland)
Olympic wrestlers of Finland
Wrestlers at the 1924 Summer Olympics
Finnish male sport wrestlers
Sportspeople from South Karelia